Rasa Renaissance is a movement in the art of painting that makes evocation of rasas (emotional moods) the prime aim in the creation and appreciation of a work of art. Rasa is the quality of emotional fulfilment that a work of art produces through the personalities, their expression and the situation presented in a painting. Rasa is a Sanskrit word that denotes the quality of emotional fulfilment that a work of art brings about. Rasa Theory is a theory of aesthetic criticism that has been prevalent in appreciation of literary works in Sanskrit language for millenniums (see: Indian aesthetic).

The idea of Rasa Renaissance evolved in the last quarter of the twentieth century in the domain of painting, as a countermovement to abstract and conceptual art. Rasa Renaissance is led by artist, philosopher and Sanskrit scholar Dr. Mumbiram of India (Ph.D. Berkeley California). In the twentieth century, the art of painting progressively became dissociated from depiction of personalities in real-world situations. It concerned itself with exploration of forms and colours for their own sake. It became more or less an exercise in clever intellectual sophistication. Art of Rasa Renaissance presupposes personalities in various situations, and in various emotional states, as being central to a work of art.

Rasa art and personalist art 
The emotions that the creator of a painting has in mind, the emotions that personalities who appear in a painting share with each other, as also the emotions that are aroused in the viewer of a painting, are all of concern in appreciation of a work of rasa art.
As emotions are states in the minds of personalities, rasa art presupposes depictions of personalities in various situations and various emotional states to be the subject matter of a rasa painting. Painting that concerns itself with depictions of personalities in various situations and various emotional states is "personalist art". The realm of personalist art is personalism.

Personalist and impersonalist in history of art 
Throughout the long history of art there has always been personalist as well as impersonal art. Portraits of kings, demigods, gods, mythological figures, saints as also ordinary people are examples of personalist art. Scenes in the lives of important as well as ordinary people are other examples. There were also battle scenes, domestic scenes, mythological and religious events. Impersonal Art existed in the form of landscapes, still-life and decorative designs. Till the late 19th century, art remained more or less representational. The beginning of the 20th century saw art indulging in deliberate distortions in depictions of personalities as well as inanimate objects. Soon afterwards, art saw itself dissociating from representation of real-world objects and personalities. Exploration of colours and forms for their own sake, without reference to any real-world entities became the subject matter of abstract paintings. Art became impersonal.

Origins of personalist art and Rasa Renaissance 
The idea of Rasa Renaissance first appeared in the art and writings of artist Mumbiram of India. The idea of personalist art first appears in two articles that Mumbiram wrote in 1985 in his native Marathi language in Pune's Ravivar Sakal. "In Search of an Art that transcends Culture" and "The Practice of Personalist Art". In these autobiographical articles, Mumbiram describes his affectionate rapport with his artist grandfather, his success as a prodigious child artist, his giving up art to devote himself to mathematics, his years in the graduate school at Berkeley, his déjà vu with art, his search for art that does not align itself with any culture (sanskritinirapeksha), his falling in love with Krishna and his arrival back in India as a personalist artist.

Here Mumbiram calls his own art Vyaktisaapeksha Kalaa. Saapekshataa would translate to relativity. Saapeksha would translate to 'depending on' or 'in expectation of'. Kalaa translates to Art, Art in reference to persons - Art in the context of persons. This is where the usage Personalist Art first appears.

In an article appearing in the Sunday Maharashtra Herald, "Waiting in the Wings" in 1986, journalist Ashok Gopal introduces Mumbiram: "Mumbiram calls his Art Personalist Art..." The same article carries an Artist's Manifesto which makes clear reference to Personalism: "Personalism is a frontal attack on materialism on the aesthetic front", "Personalism leaves no room for the existential void".

The idea of Rasa Theory as basic to appreciation of art appears in an article about Mumbiram appearing in Mumbai's Sunday Observer in 1988 written by Sudhir Sonalkar. An interview with Mumbiram for the Mumbai tabloid Mid-Day has Mumbiram talking about Rasa Theory.

Distant Drummer Publishing has produced High Five of Love, a five-volume ensemble of English translations of Sanskrit Rasa classics wherein Mumbiram's original Rasa art is juxtaposed with Rasa literature. A catalog of exhibition of Mumbiram's Book Readers: Love on the Gutenberg Galaxy cites Rasa theory of aesthetic appreciation as relevant to appreciation of Mumbiram's art. It also gives an extensive bibliography of classical works on Rasa theory. Another extensive catalog of Mumbiram's work is titled: Rasa Renaissance.

Prema vivarta mood 
According to Vaishnavism theology, Krishna is Rasaraj, the supreme source of all rasas. Depictions of incidents in Krishna's biography are most attractive subjects for Rasa art. In the prema vivarta mood of attachment to Krishna, everything in the phenomenal world appears to the lover of Krishna as a déjà vu of something related to Krishna. Many Rasa masterpieces are made in the prema vivarta mood. Ashok Gopal quotes Mumbiram: "My raven-dark rambunctious, roaming, rag-picking girlfriends remind me of Krishna and his boys in the forests of Vrindavan."

Comparison with the Pre-Raphaelites (a paradigm shift) 
Pre-Raphaelites were rebelling against the 'stodgy' Royal Academy. Somehow the romance was missing in the artists' lives. This group formed a secret brotherhood. Real life muses inspired their works. The inspiration was reflected in their paintings. The real lives of the artists and their works had a symbiotic relationship between them.

Rasa art, or art of Rasa Renaissance, is rebelling against the far more 'stodgy' art establishment of the twentieth century. Art degenerated into creation of 'brand equity' in logos. Depiction of persons was pigeonholed into the category of 'figurative' and 'representational' art for the less intelligent simpletons. Art museums, auction houses, art galleries and art schools all descended into a rut of vested interests. Rasa Renaissance rebels by bringing back into the purview of contemporary art the noble situations of human existence, the innate beauty of personalities and love amongst individuals. By the standards of the Rasa Theory of aesthetics, only Personalist Art can genuinely evoke rasas. So-called 'abstract' art is merely Impersonal Art, severely limited in its ability to invoke any rasa.

The Pre-Raphaelites used muses as models. They used monochrome, posed photographs of their muses/models to achieve realism. They spent considerable effort in painting carpets and folds in clothing. They strived to make paintings appear 'as good as' colour photographs.

Rasa art is inspired by real-life muses. They are not professional models. They are from an entirely different milieu. The artist meets them through personal encounter of the romantic type. Living in an era when color photography and photoshop are commonplace, rasa art is predominantly charcoal renderings. They are effortless quick live renderings. They don't aspire for photorealism. The person is of prime importance. The surroundings are not even depicted. The drama of the meeting and also the rendering is the 'high' the artist and the muses share. The admirers meet the artist in equally surprising ways. They are thrilled to be caught in the real life milieu of a classical painter. They are impulsively inspired to buy the work from the artist himself, from the environment where the work was produced.

Personalism in theology, love and art 
According to tenets of Personalism, an Impersonal paradigm of divinity gives rise to the existential void and absence of values.
Love of impersonal objects, in preference to love of individuals, gives rise to materialism. Impersonalism in art is epitomized in abstract art.

Proponents of Rasa Renaissance see distortions in painting as sarcastic and cynical expressions. Rasa Art strives for simplicity, innocence, faith and devotion. Rasa Art strives for honesty to an indigenous aesthetic and an awareness of one's own beauty. Personalism sees man made in the image of God. There is no room for 'existential void'. Personalism focuses attention on love and grace amongst individuals, in preference to fascination with matter.

References
 www.mumbiram.com 
 www.distantdrummer.org (Distant Drummer Publications)
 Washington Post (Sept. 18, 1979). "Cruel Penance for a Brahmin" (Front page interview with Mumbiram by Christopher Dickey in which Mumbiram calls America a jungle where he did his 12 years of austerities and penances)
 Washington Post (Oct. 12, 1979). Interview from Washington D.C. Jail by Christopher Dickey after Mumbiram succeeded in getting deported purely for aesthetic reasons.
 Times of India (Oct. 1979). Item in Current Topics that begins, "The Law is an ass they say....". (Mumbiram befuddles the immigration barriers)
Raviwar Sakal (March 17, 1985). "In Search of Art that Transcends Culture" 
 Raviwar Sakal (June 16, 1985). "Practice of Personalist Art" (First person accounts by Mumbiram).
 Mumbiram's 1979 poster  "ALIEN", this epitomizes young Mumbiram's pursuit of the Romantic Ideal.
 Maharashtra Herald (June 23, 1988). "Waiting in the Wings", an article by Journalist and author Ashok Gopal shows it is impossible for the casual eye to know the brilliant details of Mumbiram's life.
 Poona Digest (1989). "Who is Afraid of Friedrich Nietzsche?", article by Mumbiram brings out the inner workings of a creative mind.
 Sunday Observer (1989). "Banishing Tourist Type Visions", Journalist Sudhir Sonalkar's article gives a cursory glimpse about the artist living in the vegetable marketplace.

Art movements
Indian art